The Ramen Girl is a 2008 romantic comedy-drama film starring Brittany Murphy about a girl who goes to Japan and decides to learn how to cook ramen. Murphy also co-produced.

Plot
Abby (Brittany Murphy) is an American girl who goes to Tokyo to be with her boyfriend, Ethan (Gabriel Mann). Ethan tells her that he has to go to Osaka on a business trip and may not be back for a while. Abby asks to go with him but Ethan refuses and breaks up with her. Abby goes to a ramen shop afterward, and the chef Maezumi (Toshiyuki Nishida) and his wife Reiko (Kimiko Yo) tell her that they are closed. Abby does not understand them as she does not speak Japanese. She starts to cry, so the chef conveys to her to sit down. He brings her a bowl of ramen, and she loves it. A small distance away, she hallucinates that the lucky cat, known as the Maneki Neko, or Beckoning Cat, gestures to her to come over. When she tries to pay for her meal, the chef and his wife refuse.

The next day she comes back and sits down at the counter. He gives her another bowl of ramen and she eats. As she eats, she breaks into uncontrollable giggles, as does another patron. The following day she returns, but is told they are out of ramen. Seeing the wife's swollen ankles, she insists on helping instead. After the night is through, she is passed out asleep in the back. They shoo her out, but as she is walking away she realizes she wants to cook ramen. Rushing back into the store, she begs him to teach her how to cook ramen. He argues, but finally gives in and tells her to come the next day at 5. She shows up late, in high heels and a dress, and is put to work scrubbing the toilet and cleaning pots and pans. In the following weeks Maezumi only gives her cleaning work in the hopes that she quits, but she comes back. After she is given work as a waitress, she wins the hearts of all who come in, including two older women who are regular customers, and a 30-ish male laborer regular who develops a crush on her.

On a rare night off, she heads to a night club with a British man named Charlie and an American woman named Gretchen whom she met earlier. The three meet Toshi Iwamoto (Sohee Park) and his friends. Abby and Toshi fall in love.

Abby learns during the Christmas week of someone named Shintaro. She sees Maezumi crying over a collection of letters and photos from Paris. His wife then tells Abby that Maezumi and Shintaro, their son, have not spoken in 5 years since Shintaro left for France.

Toshi has to go to Shanghai, China for three years. He asks Abby to come with him, but she declines, saying she can't. They share their last kiss.

Abby soon learns how to make ramen, but Maezumi insists that it has no soul. Maezumi's mother tastes her ramen and tells her, in Japanese, that she is cooking with her head; when Abby confesses that there is only pain in her heart, Maezumi's mother advises that she should put tears in her ramen, as she has no love to share. Later in the film, she is shown cooking ramen, crying. The two ladies, the 20-ish male laborer, and another 20-ish male laborer from Okinawa, taste her ramen and almost immediately become melancholic, the pain in Abby's ramen bringing out their own. Maezumi tastes it, and starts to cry, but goes upstairs to his home.

One day, Maezumi talks with a rival, who brags about his son having a master chef come to taste his ramen while ridiculing Maezumi for trying to train Abby. Maezumi, drunk, says that her ramen will receive the Master Chef's blessing, or he'll stop making ramen. The Master arrives, and tastes the young man's ramen, sampling small bits of it, very sparingly. He gives him his blessing, and goes on to Abby.

Abby has strayed from the safety of conventional ramen, and made hers with peppers, corn and tomato, a concoction she calls "Goddess Ramen". The Master says Abby's noodles are good, but he cannot give her his blessing, saying that she needs more time and restraint. Maezumi is sad to have to stop his business, but talks to Abby. He tells her about his son wanting to learn French cooking, but she does not understand. He tells her that the ramen shop needs a successor, and that she is the successor of his ramen shop. She leaves for America soon, but before that, is invited to a celebration. Maezumi gives her the lantern that had hung outside his ramen shop for 45 years, and she takes it to America with her, where it is shown a year later outside her shop in New York City, appropriately named The Ramen Girl. The shop hangs a photo of Maezumi and his wife with their son happily in Paris. Then, an employee of hers tells her about a man wanting to see her. It is Toshi.

He says he hated his job and that he decided to do what she would do: quit his job and go back to what he loved – writing music. She welcomes him to her ramen shop and they kiss.

Cast 
 Brittany Murphy as Abby, the main character
 Toshiyuki Nishida as Maezumi, Abby's Sensei, and the ramen chef
 Sohee Park as Toshi Iwamoto, Abby's friend (soon boyfriend)
 Daniel Evans as Charlie, Abby's British friend
 Tammy Blanchard as Gretchen, Abby's 'Southern' friend
 Kimiko Yo as Reiko, Maezumi's wife
 Tsutomu Yamazaki as Grand Master
 Renji Ishibashi as Udagawa
 Gabriel Mann as Ethan, Abby's boyfriend and later ex-boyfriend
 Masayoshi Haneda as Yuki

Reception
Film critic Don Willmott describes The Ramen Girl as "a vacuous but atmospheric analysis of the redemptive power of a good bowl of noodles" in which "The Karate Kid meets Tampopo meets Babette's Feast."

References

External links

2008 romantic comedy-drama films
2008 multilingual films
2008 films
American multilingual films
American romantic comedy-drama films
Cooking films
English-language Japanese films
Films about interracial romance
Films set in Japan
Films set in Tokyo
Films shot in Jacksonville, Florida
Films shot in Tokyo
Japanese multilingual films
Japanese romantic comedy-drama films
2000s Japanese-language films
Films scored by Carlo Siliotto
Japan in non-Japanese culture
Films directed by Robert Allan Ackerman
2000s American films